Ricardo Antonio Ulloa Alonzo (born 2 July 1990) is a Salvadoran professional footballer.

Club career

CD FAS
On 30 July 2010, Ulloa played his first game for FAS as an 86th minute sub against Xelajú, the match ended 1–1, then 2 days later he scored twice in a 2–2 draw with Vista Hermosa.

He scored against Águila on 7 November 2010 in a 3–1 away defeat. He scored in the 2–2 draw against Once Municipal on 6 March 2011. On 14 March 2012 he scored twice against UES in a 4–1 home win.

Ulloa then scored in his next 4 games starting with a 1–1 draw against Juventud Independiente (25 March 2012) against Firpo (2–2, 1 April).

He scored against Isidro Metapán on 22 April 2012 in a 2–0 home win.

Spartaks Jūrmala
On 1 July, Ricardo Ulloa was signed by the Latvian Higher League club Spartaks Jūrmala on a six-month loan deal.

Ulloa scored his first goal for the club on his debut in a 2–3 loss to FK Ventspils on 14 July 2013. His loan ended along with the season in November. Spartaks finished in 7th position of the league with Ulloa scoring three goals.

International career

Ulloa made his international debut in a friendly match against New Zealand that ended in a 2–2 draw.

Personal life
Ulloa is the son of former El Salvador national team player Óscar Lagarto Ulloa. His brother Óscar Ulloa was player of FAS.

Club statistics

References

1990 births
People from Santa Ana Department
Living people
Salvadoran footballers
C.D. FAS footballers
Association football forwards
El Salvador international footballers
Salvadoran expatriate footballers
FK Spartaks Jūrmala players
Expatriate footballers in Latvia
Santa Tecla F.C. footballers
A.D. Isidro Metapán footballers
C.D. Sonsonate footballers